Natsiatum is a genus of flowering plants belonging to the family Icacinaceae.

Its native range is the Indian Subcontinent to Southern Central China and Indo-China.

Species
Species:
 Natsiatum herpeticum Buch.-Ham. ex Arn.

References

Icacinaceae
Asterid genera